Submarine aircraft carriers were developed by the Imperial Japanese Navy to a greater extent than any other navy, before and during World War II. In total, 42 were built, as listed below (other sources say 47). Although other navies had experimented with submarine aircraft carriers, by World War II the IJN was the only navy (aside from one fielded by the French Navy) using them. They had little effect on the war, although two were used to carry out attacks on the continental United States. 

They all carried floatplanes, with some carrying two or three floatplanes. All apart from the first (I-5) had a fixed catapult and hangar or hangars, generally on the forward deck.

List of submarine carriers  

 Type J1M scouting submarine (one built, I-5)  The first IJN submarine to carry a floatplane, completed 1 July 1932. No catapult was fitted, the I-5 aircraft was assembled on deck and lowered into the water for takeoff. Had two hangars.
 Type J2 scouting submarine (one built, I-6)  Carried one floatplane
 Type J3 scouting submarine (two built, I-7 and I-8)  Carried one floatplane, fitted with fixed catapult aft and twin hangars. Japanese submarine I-8 was the only submarine to complete a round-trip voyage between Japan and Europe during World War II.
 Type A1 headquarters submarines (three built, I-9, I-10, I-11)  Carried one floatplane, two more cancelled 1942.
 Type A2 headquarters submarine (one built, I-12)  Carried one floatplane, hangar and catapult fitted forward.
 Type AM (A modified) aircraft carrying submarine (two built, I-13, I-14)  Carried two floatplanes, catapult forward. Two not completed and three more cancelled.
 Type B1 scouting submarine (twenty built, numbered I-15 through I-39)  Carried one floatplane, hangar and catapult fitted forward). Japanese submarine I-25 launched the only plane that made an aerial bombing of the USA in wartime.
 Type B2 scouting submarine (six built, numbered I-40 through I-45)  Carried one floatplane, hangar and catapult fitted forward. Numbers 702 through 709 cancelled.
 Type B3/B4 scouting submarine (three built, I-54, I-56, I-58)  Carried one floatplane, hangar and catapult forward. 12 more cancelled) I-58 had aircraft and catapult replaced by Kaiten.
 I-400-class submarine (three built, I-400, I-401, I-402)  Carried three floatplanes, catapult forward. Were designed specifically to launch floatplane bombers against the Panama Canal. Two not completed, others cancelled.

See also 
Submarine aircraft carriers 
Imperial Japanese Navy submarines
List of undersea-carried planes during World War II#Japan

References 
 Dorr Carpenter, Dorr B. & Polmar, Norman  Submarines of the Imperial Japanese Navy (1986, Conway Maritime Press)

External links 
Submarines of the IJN

  
 
Imperial Japanese Navy